Aderlin Rodríguez (born November 18, 1991), nicknamed "A-Rod", is a Dominican Republic professional baseball corner infielder who is currently a free agent. He previously played for the New York Mets, Seattle Mariners, Baltimore Orioles and Detroit Tigers organizations, and for the Orix Buffaloes of the Nippon Professional Baseball (NPB).

Career

New York Mets

On July 2, 2008, Rodríguez signed a minor league deal with the New York Mets organization that included a $600,000 dollar signing bonus. He made his professional debut with the GCL Mets in 2009. He split the next year with the rookie ball Kingsport Mets and the Single-A Savannah Sand Gnats, slashing a combined .300/.350/.532 with 14 home runs and 59 RBI. He remained in Single-A for the 2011 season, hitting .221/.265/.372 with 17 home runs and 78 RBI in 131 games for Savannah. The next year, Rodríguez split the season between Savannah and the High-A St. Lucie Mets, batting .263/.321/.476 with 24 home runs and 83 RBI in 125 contests. He remained in St. Lucie in 2013, slashing .260/.295/.427 with 9 home runs and 41 RBI in 264 plate appearances. In 2014, Rodríguez slashed .242/.284/.366 in 89 games for St. Lucie. He began the 2015 season in Double-A with the Binghamton Mets, but was released on July 15, 2015 after batting .253/.288/.461 in 63 games.

Seattle Mariners
On July 21, 2015, Rodríguez signed a minor league deal with the Seattle Mariners and was assigned to the Jackson Generals. He finished the season in Jackson batting .206/.262/.335 with 3 home runs and 16 RBI. On November 6, 2015, Rodríguez elected free agency.

Baltimore Orioles
On January 18, 2016, Rodríguez signed a minor league deal with the Baltimore Orioles and received an invitation to Spring Training. He did not make the club out of spring and was assigned to the High-A Frederick Keys. He was named a Carolina League all-star in 2016, and batted .304/.359/.532 with 26 home runs and 93 RBI on the season. In 2017, Rodríguez played for the Double-A Bowie Baysox, hitting .279/.341/.471 with 22 home runs and 76 RBI in 125 games for the club. On November 6, 2017, Rodríguez elected free agency and re-signed with the Orioles on a new minor league contract on December 22. He spent the 2018 season with Bowie, hitting .286/.335/478 in 128 contests. On November 2, 2018, Rodríguez elected free agency.

San Diego Padres
On December 21, 2018, Rodríguez signed a minor league contract with the San Diego Padres and received an invitation to Spring Training. Rodríguez did not make the major league club and was reassigned to the El Paso Chihuahuas, with whom he would spend the entire season, slashing .321/.363/.634 with 19 home runs and 64 RBI. On November 4, 2019, he elected free agency.

Orix Buffaloes
On December 23, 2019, Rodríguez signed with the Orix Buffaloes of the Nippon Professional Baseball (NPB). On June 19, 2020, Rodríguez made his NPB debut. Rodríguez batted .218/.280/.363 with 6 home runs and 25 RBI in 59 games for the Buffaloes in 2020. On December 2, 2020, he became a free agent.

Detroit Tigers
On January 16, 2021, Rodríguez signed a minor league contract with the Detroit Tigers. Rodríguez was named Triple-A East Region MVP for the 2021 season, hitting .290 with 29 home runs and 94 RBI in 116 games. On November 9, 2021, Rodríguez declined a minor league assignment and became a free agent.

San Diego Padres (second stint)
On March 13, 2022, Rodríguez signed a minor league contract with the San Diego Padres. He was released on June 15, 2022.

Hanshin Tigers
On July 11, 2022, Rodriguez signed with the Hanshin Tigers of Nippon Professional Baseball. He became a free agent following the 2022 season.

References

External links

1991 births
Living people
Baseball third basemen
Binghamton Mets players
Bowie Baysox players
Dominican Republic expatriate baseball players in Japan
Dominican Republic expatriate baseball players in the United States
El Paso Chihuahuas players
Frederick Keys players
Gigantes del Cibao players
Gulf Coast Mets players
Hanshin Tigers players
Jackson Generals (Southern League) players
Leones del Escogido players
Kingsport Mets players
Nippon Professional Baseball first basemen
Orix Buffaloes players
Savannah Sand Gnats players
Scottsdale Scorpions players
Sportspeople from Santo Domingo
St. Lucie Mets players
Toledo Mud Hens players